The Deutsche Futsal-Meisterschaft (until 2015: DFB Futsal Cup) was the top futsal championship in Germany. It was founded in 2006. The championship which is played under UEFA rules, consists of the champion and runner-up of each Futsal-Regionalliga. Organized by German Football Association. The champion qualified for the UEFA Futsal Champions League. The Championship has been played in the Futsal-Bundesliga since the 2021-22 season.

Champions

References

External links
Deutsche Futsal-Meisterschaft on dfb.de 

Futsal competitions in Germany
Germany
2006 establishments in Germany